Milecastle 27 (Low Brunton) was a milecastle of the Roman Hadrian's Wall. It was located on the line of Hadrian's Wall, approximately midway between the A6079 and the River North Tyne.

Construction 
Milecastle 27 was a long-axis milecastle with unknown gateway type.  Such milecastles were thought to have been constructed by the Legio XX Valeria Victrix who were based in Deva Victrix (Chester).

The milecastle had internal dimensions of  N-S and  E-W. The milecastle is of type IV, with broad side walls.

Excavations and investigations
1930 – Milecastle 27 was located on 5 April by Miss T Hepple.
1952 – The dimensions of the Milecastel were established.  No coins or inscriptions were found. Only one piece of pottery was found, but it was not dateable.
1966 – English Heritage Field Investigation.  It was noted that the milecastle was visible as a low but distinct mound in a pasture field, but that no stonework remained.  The milecastle was surveyed at 1:2500.
1989 – English Heritage Field Investigation. Nettle growth was noted within.

Associated turrets 
Each milecastle on Hadrian's Wall had two associated turret structures.  These turrets were positioned approximately one-third and two-thirds of a Roman mile to the west of the Milecastle, and would probably have been manned by part of the milecastle's garrison.  The turrets associated with Milecastle 27 are known as Turret 27A and Turret 27B.

Turret 27A
Turret 27A was demolished soon after construction to allow the construction of Cilurnum (Chesters Roman Fort).  Therefore, only its foundations exist, underlying the remains of the fort.  They are located immediately to the east of the northwest corner of the fort's principia (headquarters block).  The foundations measured  square.  The remaining foundations consist of a single layer of clay and massive cobbles.

Location on Ordnance Survey 1:25 000 map:

Turret 27B
No traces of Turret 27B remain.  The position is calculated.

Location (by calculation)

Monument records

Public access
There is no public access to Milecastle 27, or the calculated site of Turret 27B.

Access to Turret 27A is with English Heritage admission to Chesters Roman Fort.

References

Bibliography

27
Wall, Northumberland